The 1976 LPGA Tour was the 27th season since the LPGA Tour officially began in 1950. The season ran from January 30 to November 27. The season consisted of 31 official money events. Judy Rankin won the most tournaments, six. She also led the money list with earnings of $150,734.

The season saw the first official tournaments played outside North America; the Colgate European Open in England, the LPGA/Japan Mizuno Classic in Japan, the Colgate-Hong Kong Open in Hong Kong, and the Colgate Far East Championship in the Philippines. There were four first-time winners in 1976: Pat Bradley, Hisako "Chako" Higuchi, the first winner from Japan, Sally Little, the first winner from Africa, and Jan Stephenson.

The tournament results and award winners are listed below.

Tournament results
The following table shows all the official money events for the 1976 season. "Date" is the ending date of the tournament. The numbers in parentheses after the winners' names are the number of wins they had on the tour up to and including that event. Majors are shown in bold.

LPGA Tour vs. The Masters Tournament
In January 1976 the LPGA Tour announced the formation of a new tournament. It was to be titled the Ladies Masters and sponsors said they would pattern the event similar to the Masters Tournament. A little over a month later the LPGA announced the tournament's name was being changed to the Women's International. This happened after Masters Tournament officials contacted the tournament's sponsor and threatened to go to court unless the word Masters wasn't removed from the tournament title.

The Women's International proved to be a short lived event. Its final edition was played in 1985.

Awards

References

External links
LPGA Tour official site
1976 season coverage at golfobserver.com

LPGA Tour seasons
LPGA Tour